Edward William Nelson (1883–1923) was a British marine biologist and polar explorer. Educated at Clifton College, Tonbridge School and Cambridge University, he was independently wealthy. He worked at the Marine Biological Association of the United Kingdom (MBA) in Plymouth and was member of the 1910–1913 British Antarctic Expedition. In association with E. J. Allen, he developed a simple method for culturing phytoplankton.

Polar expedition 
In 1910, he joined the British Antarctic Expedition (popularly known as "The Terra Nova Expedition") led by Robert Falcon Scott, and served as a biologist. He took part in a sledging journey to One Ton Depot, carrying food supplies for the returning polar party. He also conducted tidal observations while at Cape Evans and was later awarded the Polar Medal along with the other Terra Nova members. He was commemorated with Nelson Cliff at the west side of the Simpson Glacier in Antarctica (71°14′S, 168°42′E).

Later career 
On his return from the Antarctic, Nelson worked as Senior Naturalist at the laboratory in Plymouth, taking leave to fight with the British 63rd (Royal Naval) Division in the Gallipoli campaign, then later in the trenches of France. In 1920 the Ministry of Agriculture, Fisheries and Food approached the MBA to propose that the Association undertake the manufacture of a large number of "Drift Bottles", to be used in tracking the movement of the waters of the North Sea. By this time, Nelson was the Scientific Superintendent of the Fisheries Board for Scotland, and wrote a paper on the manufacture of the drift bottles for the Association's Journal.

Death 
On 17 January 1923, Nelson was found dead in his laboratory as a result of a self-injected poison. An inquest into his death was reported in The Express and Telegraph newspaper, which was published on 1 March 1923.

Over 80 years later, his daughter Barbara, then 93, died during a trip to Antarctica in 2009.

Literature 

"Bergy Bits: The Newsletter of the Friends of the Antarctic", No. 28 April 2009 

 Volume 2, page 1091.

External links 
 
 Edward Nelson collection at the Scott Polar Research Institute

References 

20th-century British zoologists
1883 births
1923 suicides
British Antarctic scientists
British marine biologists
Explorers of Antarctica
Terra Nova expedition
Suicides by poison
Suicides in the United Kingdom